Néstor Martínez (born March 13, 1981) is a Guatemalan football defender who most recently played for Deportivo Petapa of Guatemala's second division.

Club career
Martínez started his professional career at local giants Comunicaciones where he would win two league titles before moving to Deportivo Marquense in 2006. In summer 2009 he joined Petapa, but in November 2009 he was deemed surplus to requirements.

International career
Martínez made his debut for Guatemala as a late substitute in an October 2002 friendly match against Jamaica and went on to collect a total of 51 caps, scoring no goals. He has represented his country in 11 FIFA World Cup qualification matches  and at the 2003, 2005 and 2007 CONCACAF Gold Cup Finals as well as at the 2003, 2005 and 2007 UNCAF Cup tournaments.

His final international was a November 2007 friendly match, also against Jamaica.

External links

References

1978 births
Living people
People from Izabal Department
Association football defenders
Guatemalan footballers
Guatemala international footballers
2003 UNCAF Nations Cup players
2003 CONCACAF Gold Cup players
2005 UNCAF Nations Cup players
2005 CONCACAF Gold Cup players
2007 UNCAF Nations Cup players
2007 CONCACAF Gold Cup players
Comunicaciones F.C. players
Deportivo Marquense players
Deportivo Petapa players